Rinzia dimorphandra, commonly known as the Esperance rinzia, is a plant species of the family Myrtaceae endemic to Western Australia.

It blooms in October producing white-pink flowers.

It is found along the south coast in the Goldfields-Esperance region of Western Australia centred around the town of Esperance where it grows in sandy soils.

References

dimorphandra
Endemic flora of Western Australia
Myrtales of Australia
Rosids of Western Australia
Taxa named by George Bentham
Taxa named by Ferdinand von Mueller
Plants described in 1986